Katja Langkeit (born 1983) is a German team handball player. She plays on the German national team, and participated at the 2011 World Women's Handball Championship in Brazil.

References

1983 births
Living people
German female handball players